The Peabody Institute of The Johns Hopkins University is a private conservatory and preparatory school in Baltimore, Maryland. It was founded in 1857 and opened in 1866 by merchant/financier and philanthropist George Peabody (1795–1869), and is the oldest conservatory in the United States. Its association with JHU in recent decades, begun in 1977, allows students to do research across disciplines.

History
George Peabody (1792–1869) founded the institute with a bequest of about $800,000 from his fortune made initially in Massachusetts and later augmented in Baltimore (where he lived and worked from 1815 to 1835) and vastly increased in banking and finance during following residences in New York City and London, where he became the wealthiest American of his time.

Completion of the white marble Grecian-Italianate west wing/original building housing the institute, designed by Edmund George Lind, was delayed by the Civil War. It was dedicated in 1866, with Peabody himself, traveling across the North Atlantic Ocean, speaking at the ceremonies on the front steps in front of landmark Washington Monument circle before a large audience of notaries and citizens including hundreds of assembled pupils from the Baltimore City Public Schools. Under the direction of well-known musicians, composers, conductors, and Peabody alumni, the conservatory, concerts, lecture series, library and art gallery, led by men of literary and intellectual lights along with an annual awarding of gold, silver and bronze medals with certificates and cash prizes to top graduates of the city, known as the "Peabody Prizes", attracted a considerable national attention to the Institute and the city's growing culture. Under strong academic leadership, the Peabody evolved into an internationally renowned cultural and literary center through the late 19th and the 20th centuries, especially after a major expansion in 1877–1878, with the completion of its eastern half housing the George Peabody Library with iconic five stacked tiers of wrought iron balconies holding book stacks/shelves, surmounted by a beveled glass skylight, one of the most beautiful and distinctive libraries in the U.S.

The institute building's 1878 east wing on East Mount Vernon Place containing the affiliated George Peabody Library, joined the other rows of architecturally significant structures of townhouses, mansions, art gallery, clubs, hotels, churches around the Nation's first memorial to its first President which developed into the Mount Vernon-Belvedere neighborhood, carved from the rolling hills north of Baltimore Town on the estate and nearby mansion of "Belviedere", home of Revolutionary War commander of famous "Maryland Line" troops in the Continental Army, Colonel John Eager Howard (1752–1827). The institute grew from a local academy, with an art and sculpture gallery, public lecture series, and the extensive non-circulating reference library which predated the later first public library system in America. That library was created and endowed in 1882 by Peabody's friend and fellow "Bay-Stater", merchant/philanthropist Enoch Pratt (1808–1896). (In turn, both Peabody and Pratt inspired steel industrialist and multi-millionaire Andrew Carnegie (1835–1919) of Pittsburgh, Pennsylvania, who endowed more than 2,500 libraries and buildings across America.)

In 1955, Peabody inaugurated a Sacred Music department led by Arthur Howes; the department no longer exists.

In 1978, "The Peabody" began working with The Johns Hopkins University (founded by will/bequest by another extremely wealthy merchant, Johns Hopkins (1795–1873), in 1876), under an affiliation agreement. In 1985, the institute officially became a division of "The Hopkins".

Peabody is one of 156 schools in the United States that offers a Doctorate of Musical Arts degree. It houses two libraries: the historical George Peabody Library (originally the Peabody Institute Library) established when the Institute opened in 1866, renowned for its collection of 19th-century era and other rare books and the Arthur Friedheim Library (named for Russian-born pianist/conductor Arthur Friedheim, 1859–1932), a separate music reference academic library added to supplement the institute's original library (now the separate George Peabody Library in the east wing) that includes more than 100,000 books, scores, and sound recordings.

The conservatory was later supplemented by a preparatory school ("Peabody Prep"), and an auditorium/music hall. Under instructions from Peabody's original 1857 bequest—an art and sculpture gallery, non-circulating public research library, with a public lecture series, and a system of awarding gold, silver and bronze medals, and certificates with money prizes for top honor graduates of Baltimore's then only public secondary schools; (the all-male Central High School of Baltimore, founded 1839 (now The Baltimore City College, since 1868) and female Eastern and Western High Schools, founded 1844). "Peabody Prizes" are awarded to top high school graduates beginning the following year at commencement exercises and continued for 122 years as an honored annual tradition with public announcements to city's media.

Additional structures to the south and east of somewhat jarring modernistic light tan/brown brick along East Centre Street and Saint Paul Street (with a street-level parking garage) were constructed in 1971 with two corner towers. During the early 1990s, several remaining townhouses on East Mount Vernon Place to the east intersection with St. Paul were acquired and rebuilt leaving their front original facades facing the historic Monument squares /pocket parks but rebuilt interiors and extended to the rears. Along with other townhouses acquired to the south with distinctive iron scrollwork balconies facing North Charles Street /south Washington Place, for a senior citizens hostel. This enabled The Peabody to round out its tight campus of attached buildings on the entire city block bounded by Charles, Mount Vernon Place, St. Paul and Centre Streets.

Some or all of the Peabody campus is included in the Mount Vernon Place Historic District, which was listed on the National Register of Historic Places and also designated a National Historic Landmark District in 1971.

The Peabody Institute's historic building at 1-21 E. Mount Vernon Place, built during 1857-1878, was designated a Baltimore City Landmark on October 14, 1975.

Preparatory
Peabody Preparatory offers instruction and enrichment programs for school-age children across various sites in Baltimore and its surrounding counties: "Downtown" (Baltimore, main campus), Towson, Annapolis (Maryland Hall for the Creative Arts) and Howard County (in cooperation with three schools).

Peabody Children's Chorus
The Peabody Children's Chorus is for children ages 6 to 18. It is divided into three groups: Training Choir, Choristers, and Cantate, grouped by age in ascending order. They practice weekly in Towson or Columbia, Maryland, and sing in concerts biannually under the instruction of Doreen Falby. Cantate, ages 12 to 18, frequently perform with other groups, such as the Baltimore Symphony Orchestra, The Baltimore Chamber Orchestra, The Mid-Atlantic Symphony Orchestra, and the Baltimore Choral Arts Society, and have toured both regionally and internationally.

Notable students

 Tori Amos, singer, songwriter, pianist; the youngest student ever admitted to the institute.
 Dominick Argento, composer
 James Atherton, tenor 
 Zuill Bailey, cellist
 Manuel Barrueco, guitarist
 Carter Brey, cellist
 Petrit Çeku, Guitarist
 Angelin Chang, pianist
 George Colligan, pianist/trumpeter/drummer/composer
 Charles Covington, pianist
 Viet Cuong, composer
 Gemze de Lappe, dancer
 Charity Sunshine Tillemann-Dick, operatic soprano
 Ruth Wales du Pont, socialite, philanthropist, and classical composer
 Joshua Fineberg, composer
 Virgil Fox, organist
 James Allen Gähres, conductor (music)
 Philip Glass, composer
 Hilary Hahn, violinist
 Michael Hedges, guitarist
 Michael Hersch, composer
 Margarita Höhenrieder, pianist
 Kim Kashkashian, violist
 Fred Karpoff, pianist and artist-teacher
 Kevin Kenner, pianist
 Custer LaRue, soprano
 O'Donel Levy, guitarist
 Richard Leibert, organist
 David Meece, pianist, singer, songwriter
 Su Meng, Guitarist
 Sylvia Meyer, harpist; the first female member of the National Symphony Orchestra
 Thomas F. McNulty, a president of the WWIN-FM Baltimore and a member of the Maryland House of Delegates from 1942 to 1946
 Jessye Norman, operatic soprano
 Piotr Pakhomkin, Guitarist
 Rebecca Pitcher, actress; primarily known for playing Christine in the Broadway adaption of The Phantom of the Opera
 Awadagin Pratt, pianist
 Lance Reddick, actor, musician
 Ilyich Rivas, conductor (music)
 Jake Runestad, composer
 Lillian Smith, author of Strange Fruit
 Ana Vidović, Guitarist
 André Watts, pianist
 Hugh Wolff, conductor and director of orchestras at the New England Conservatory of Music.
 Eliza Woods, composer and pianist
 Igor Zubkovsky, cellist

Notable faculty

 Diran Alexanian, cello

 Manuel Barrueco, guitar
 Oscar Bettison, composition
 George Frederick Boyle, piano
 Garnett Bruce, opera
 Elliott Carter (1946–48), composition
 Thomas Dolby, Music for New Media
 Du Yun, composition
 David Fedderly, tuba
 Leon Fleisher, piano
 Virgil Fox, organist
 Elizabeth Futral, voice
 Denyce Graves, voice
 Richard Franko Goldman, Director (1968–1977), President (1969–1977)
 Asger Hamerik, Director (1871–1898)
 Michael Hersch, composition
 Ernest Hutcheson, piano
 Sean Jones, jazz
 Richard Johnson, jazz
 Jean Eichelberger Ivey, composition, electronic music
 Stephen Kates, cello

 Katharine Lucke (1875-1962) - organ, composition
 Nicholas Maw (1935–2009), composition
 Anthony McGill, clarinet
 Gustav Meier, conducting
 Edward Palanker, clarinet
 Amit Peled, cello
 Marina Piccinini, flute
 Joel Puckett, theory
 Kevin Puts, composition
 Hollis Robbins, humanities
 Berl Senofsky, violin

 John Shirley-Quirk, voice
 Robert van Sice, percussion
 Barry Tuckwell, horn
 Frank Valentino, voice
 John Walker, organ
 Warren Wolf, jazz
 Eliza Woods, piano
 Chen Yi, composition (1996-1998)

See also
Music school
Music schools in the United States

References

External links

 

Johns Hopkins University
Universities and colleges in Baltimore
Music schools in Maryland
Educational institutions established in 1857
Mount Vernon, Baltimore
Music of Baltimore
1857 establishments in Maryland
Historic district contributing properties in Maryland
Mount Vernon Place Historic District
Baltimore City Landmarks